Albach may refer to:

Peter Albach (born 1956), German politician
Albach (Wetter), a river of Hesse, Germany, tributary of the Wetter

See also
Rosa Albach-Retty (1874–1980), Austrian actress
Wolf Albach-Retty (1906–1967), Austrian actor